Lincoln Park is a census-designated place in Spring and Cumru Townships in Berks County, Pennsylvania, United States.  It is located between the community of West Wyomissing and the borough of Shillington.  As of the 2010 census, the population was 1,615  residents.

Demographics

References

Populated places in Berks County, Pennsylvania